Walter Trier (25 June 1890, Prague – 8 July 1951 Craigleith, near Collingwood, Ontario, Canada) was a Czech-German illustrator, best known for his work for the children's books of Erich Kästner and the covers of the magazine Lilliput.

Life
Trier was born to a middle class German-speaking Jewish family in Prague. In 1905, Trier entered the Industrial School of Fine and Applied Arts; he later moved to the Prague Academy. In 1906, he entered the Royal Academy, Munich, where he studied under Franz Stuck and Erwin Knirr. In 1910, at age 20, Trier moved to Berlin where he spent most of his career. There he became known for his caricatures and children's book illustrations.

Trier married Helene Mathews in 1913; a daughter, Margaret, was born a year later.

An anti-fascist, Trier's cartoons were bitterly opposed by the Nazis. In 1936 he emigrated to London. During the Second World War, Trier helped the Ministry of Information produce anti-Nazi leaflets and political propaganda. He and his wife became British citizens in 1947, the same year that they moved to Canada to be near their daughter, who had moved to Toronto with her husband in the late thirties.

Illustrations

Trier's works for the periodicals Simplicissimus and Jugend appeared in 1909. The next year, Otto Eysler, the editor of Lustige Blätter, persuaded him to move to Berlin and work for that magazine; Trier worked for Berliner Illustriete Zeitung as well.

In 1927/1929, Trier was introduced to Erich Kästner, and he illustrated Kästner's Emil und die Detektive (Emil and the Detectives).

Trier provided the front cover design for every issue of Lilliput from its start until 1949. Each time, the design employed a man, a woman, and a dog. The man and woman were usually young and almost always a couple, the dog was almost always black. It seems the original dog was Trier's. It was run over by a tram and killed, and after that Trier immortalised him in his Lilliput covers; the idea was light-hearted and the settings and styles varied considerably.

On his arrival in Canada, Trier started work on illustrations for the company Canada Packers.

Exhibitions and murals
In 1934 Trier held a one-man exhibition in Prague.

Trier also created various murals: in the Kabarett der Komiker at Kurfürstendamm (1929, destroyed by the Nazis in 1933), on the liner SS Bremen (1929), and for Hoffmann–La Roche (Welwyn Garden City, 1938). He also staged designs for Spielzeug (1924) and The Bartered Bride (1931).

Trier held an exhibition of oils and water-colours in the University of Toronto in 1951, his death year.

The Walter Trier Gallery at the Art Gallery of Ontario (AGO) Devoted to the work of Walter Trier features small rotating exhibitions of the artist's watercolours, drawings, paintings and sculpture along with satirical works on paper by other artists from the AGO collection.

In 1976 the AGO received a gift from the Trier-Fodor Foundation of over 1100 works by Trier and 345 folk toys. The gift was accompanied by an endowment to support the acquisition of humorous, satirical and illustrative art.

Bibliography

Books by Trier
Nazi-German in 22 Lessons, Broadsheet, London, 1942. Reprint: Favoritenpresse, Berlin 2022, ISBN 978-3-96849-053-3
Brer Rabbit, Harmondsworth, Middx: Penguin, Puffin, c. 1944
Dandy in the Circus, New York: Dodd, Mead, 1950
Dandy the Donkey, London: Nicholson & Watson, 1943
8192 Crazy Costumes in One Book...For Children from 5 and under to 75 and over, London: Atrium
8192 Crazy People in One Book, London: Atrium, c. 1950
8192 Quite Crazy People in One Book, London: Atrium, [1949?]
10 Little Negroes: A New Version, London: Sylvan, 1944

Books by others illustrated by Trier
 Colman, Fred A. "Artisten" (1928)
 Földes, Jolán, Peter verliert nicht den Kopf (translated from Hungarian by Stefan J. Klein)
 Harris, Joel Chandler, Brer Rabbit
 Hirschfeld, Ludwig, Wien und Budapest
 Hochstetter, Gustav, Maruschka braut gelibbtes!
 Kästner, Erich, Das doppelte Lottchen (Lisa and Lottie)
 Kästner, Erich, Der 35 Mai (The 35th of May)
 Kästner, Erich, Till Eulenspiegel the Clown, Till the Jester, and Eleven Merry Pranks of Till the Jester
 Kästner, Erich, Emil und die Detektive (Emil and the Detectives)
 Kästner, Erich, Emil und die drei Zwillinge (Emil and the Three Twins)
 Kästner, Erich, Das fliegende Klassenzimmer (The Flying Classroom)
 Kästner, Erich, Des Freiherrn von Münchhausen wunderbare Reisen und Abenteuer zu Wasser und zu Lande (Baron Munchhausen)
 Kästner, Erich, Der gestiefelte Kater (Puss in Boots)
 Kästner, Erich, Der kleine Grenzverkehr, oder, Georg und die Zwischenfälle (A Salzburg Comedy)
 Kästner, Erich, Die Konferenz der Tiere (The Animals Conference)
 Kästner, Erich, Pünktchen und Anton (Annaluise and Anton)
 Kästner, Erich, Das verhexte Telefon
 Kipling, Rudyard, Das kommt davon
 Meyer, Alfred Richard, Die Reise in die Jugend
 Meyer, Wilhelm ("My"), Fridolins Harlekinder
 Meyer, Wilhelm ("My"), Fridolins Zauberland
 Meyer, Wilhelm ("My"), Fridolins Siebenmeilenpferd
 Morgan, Diana, My Sex Right or Wrong
 Nelson, Claire, The Jolly Picnic
 Roda Roda, Die verfolgte Unschuld
 Schloemp, Felix, Der Allotria Kientopp
 Schloemp, Felix, Schabernack und Lumpenpack
 Seth-Smith, David, Jolly Families
 Seyffert, Oskar, Spielzeug
 Twain, Mark, Die Abenteuer des Tom Sawyer
 Wiseman, Herbert, Singing Together

Periodicals to which Trier contributed
 Berliner Illustrirte Zeitung
 Daily Herald (London)
 Die Dame
 Jugend
 Lilliput
 Life
 Lustige Blätter
 New Liberty
 New York Times
 Saturday Night
 Simplicissimus
 Uhu
 Die Zeitung (London)

Books about Trier and anthologies of his works
 Clements, Warren, ed. The Many Worlds of Walter Trier: Inimitable Drawings of Baron Munchausen, Tom Sawyer, Emil, Brer Rabbit and Many, Many Others. Toronto: Nestlings Press, 2019. 
Humorist Walter Trier: Selections from the Trier-Fodor Foundation Gift. The Art Gallery of Ontario, 1981. 
 Jesters in Earnest. London: Murray, 1944. Cartoons by Trier and four other Czechoslovakian artists.
 Kästner, Erich, ed. Heiteres von Walter Trier. Hannover: Fackelträger-Verl., 1959.
Lang. Lothar, ed. Walter Trier im Eulenspiegel-Verlag. [East] Berlin: Eulenspiegel-Verlag, 1971. Munich: Rogner & Bernhard, 1971. 
Lang, Lothar, ed. Das grosse Trier-Buch. [East] Berlin: Eulenspiegel-Verlag, 1972; Munich and Zurich: Piper, 1974. (New editions: 1984 and 1986.)
Lilliput: Walter Trier's World. Tokyo: Pie, 2004.  Presents 99 of Trier's covers for Lilliput; text in both Japanese and English.
Neuner-Warthorst, Antje. "Da bin ich wieder!": Walter Trier - die Berliner Jahre. Berlin: SMPK, 1999. 
Trier, Walter. Kleines Trier-Paradies. Zurich: Sanssouci-Verlag, 1955.
Trier Panoptikum. Berlin: Eysler, 1922.
 Neuner-Warthorst, Antje, Walter Trier: Politik - Kunst - Reklame, Zürich: Atrium 2006.

See also
Trier (disambiguation)

External links
 
 walter-trier.de (in German)
 Lambiek Comiclopedia article.
 Film from 1938 of Walter Trier at Work British Pathe

1890 births
1951 deaths
British illustrators
Canadian illustrators
Czech illustrators
German illustrators
Jewish illustrators
British Jews
British people of Czech descent
Canadian people of Czech-Jewish descent
Artists from Prague
Academy of Fine Arts, Munich alumni